The Rt Rev Rennie MacInnes (23 July 1870 – 24 December 1931) was a bishop in the Anglican Church in the first third of the twentieth century.

Biography
MacInnes was educated at Windlesham House School, Harrow and Trinity College, Cambridge. He was ordained in 1897. After a curacy at St Matthew's, Bayswater, he spent the rest of his career in the Middle East eventually becoming Bishop of Jerusalem.

Family
His father was the MP Miles MacInnes and his grandfather was the noted general John MacInnes. His son Angus Campbell MacInnes followed him into Holy Orders, eventually becoming Bishop of Bedford before translation to his former See Jerusalem.

References

Further reading
Notes for Travellers by road and rail in Palestine and Syria MacInnes, R: London,H.B Skinner & Co, 1926

External links

NPG details

Anglican bishops of Jerusalem
People educated at Harrow School
Alumni of Trinity College, Cambridge
20th-century Anglican bishops in the Middle East
1870 births
1931 deaths
People educated at Windlesham House School